Robert Morrison Stults (1861–1933) was an American composer of popular music in the late 19th century and early 20th century.  He used aliases such as Norwood Dale and S. M. Roberts for some of his works.

Stults wrote the musical The Cross Patch Fairies.  His most popular work, "The Sweetest Story Ever Told", was published in 1892 and was still popular into the 20th century.

According to the Morrison family history, Stults was the son of Jacob Stults and Martha-Jane Morrison. The first of five children, he was born on June 1, 1861, in Hightstown, New Jersey.  He was married to Julia Vandermeer.

Prior to 1910, Stults mostly wrote popular music, but later wrote more sacred music and bigger works.  Stults wrote three ragtime tunes, "Smoky Sam" (1898), "Walkin' on de Rainbow Road" (1899), and "A Moonlight Meander]" (1900), under the name S. M. Roberts (a play on his name Robert M. Stults). "A Moonlight Meander", was copyrighted by his wife, J. V. Stults, who often copyrighted his music.

At his death on March 24, 1933, Stults was the co-publisher of the Long Branch Daily Record in Long Branch, New Jersey.

This is a list of works that are mostly songs and piano tunes, written prior to 1910:

This is a list of works that are sacred in nature or longer works. These were generally written after 1910:

See also 
 List of ragtime composers

References

External links
 

1861 births
1933 deaths
American male composers
American composers
Composers for piano
Songwriters from New Jersey
People from Hightstown, New Jersey
American male songwriters